Temska is a village in the Pirot municipality, in south-eastern Serbia. According to the 2002 census, the village had a population of 908 people.

References

External links

 
Populated places in Pirot District